Kasimir Edschmid, born Eduard Hermann Wilhelm Schmid, (5 October 1890 in Darmstadt – 31 August 1966 in Vulpera (Switzerland)) was a German expressionist writer. His work was part of the literature event in the art competition at the 1928 Summer Olympics. Together with Carl Gunschmann he was one of the founders of the Darmstädter Sezession in 1919. 1933 his book "Westdeutsche Fahrten" was among the works burnt by the Nazis.

References

1890 births
1966 deaths
20th-century German male writers
Olympic competitors in art competitions
Writers from Darmstadt
Knights Commander of the Order of Merit of the Federal Republic of Germany